Zaphkiel ( Ṣafqīʾēl), also written as Tzaphqiel, Tzaphkiel, Zafkiel, Zafchial, Zaphchial, Zaphiel, or Zelel, is an archangel. He is sometimes equated with Zadkiel, but other times considered to be a different angel. Zaphkiel is "chief of the order of thrones and one of the 9 angels that rule Heaven; also one of the 7 archangels." He can watch people when they need to make important decisions and when they need to put them into words for others. If they are unsure of the words, he will help them to make the message more clear. The leader of the Erelim, he is associated with the planet Saturn. It is associated also with the sephira of Binah.
He is also called Raphael.

In fiction

Zaphkiel has been adapted for several pieces of modern fiction:

 Zaphkiel is an Archon of the Order of Thrones in Wizards of the Coast's roleplaying game Dungeons & Dragons.
 Zaphkiel is an Angel in Date A Live.

See also
Raphael
 List of angels in theology

References

Archangels
Individual angels